Holidays in the Danger Zone: Holidays in the Axis of Evil is a two part travel documentary on all of the countries in U.S. President George W. Bush's "Axis of evil", part of the Holidays in the Danger Zone series, produced and broadcast by BBC Correspondent (now This World). Written and presented by Ben Anderson, the series was first broadcast on 31 January 2003 from 2250 GMT on BBC Four.

Episode 1: Iran, Syria & Libya 
Episode 2: Cuba, Iraq & North Korea

In the series, Anderson visits the 6 nations in U.S. President George W. Bush's "Axis of evil".  They are all accused of harboring terrorists and attempting to build or acquire weapons of mass destruction, But, there is another connection between the six countries - you can go on holiday there as according to Anderson "First it was Iraq, Iran and North Korea. Then George W expanded the axis of evil to include Cuba, Syria and Libya. All I could find that linked these countries was that you could travel to all six on a tourist visa. So I did".

See also
 America Was Here
 Holidays in the Danger Zone
 Literature from the "Axis of Evil"
 Lullabies from the Axis of Evil
 The Violent Coast 
 Rivers 
 Meet the Stans
 Places That Don't Exist

References

External links
 Interview with Ben Anderson on BBC4 website.
 BBC News article by Ben Anderson.

BBC television documentaries
BBC World News shows